Charles Allen (born 1977) is an American Democratic politician in Washington, D.C. and member of the Council of the District of Columbia representing Ward 6. He took office on January 2, 2015, after winning the Democratic Party primary and following general election in 2014 and won re-election in 2018.

Early years and education
Charles Allen grew up in the Birmingham, Alabama suburb of Homewood and graduated from Homewood High School. Allen is married to Jordi Hutchinson. The couple has a daughter and a son.

Allen graduated from Washington and Lee University. The summer after his sophomore year, he interned at a free clinic in South Boston. He holds a Master of Public Health from the University of Alabama at Birmingham.

Political career
Allen was hired as director of public policy for the District of Columbia Primary Care Association in 2003. The following year, Allen served as the Ward 6 coordinator for Howard Dean's presidential campaign. He was a delegate for Dean at the 2004 Democratic National Convention. As chairman of the grass roots Democratic organization D.C. for Democracy, Allen sent hundreds of District residents to other states to campaign.

Allen resigned from the District of Columbia Primary Care Association to manage Tommy Wells' campaign for the Ward 6 seat on the Council of the District of Columbia in 2006. After Wells won the election, Wells hired Allen as his chief of staff.

Allen was president of the Ward 6 Democrats from 2009 to 2013. While president, the group voted to urge the Council of the District of Columbia to pass a law legalizing same-sex marriage.

In 2012, the D.C. Democratic State Committee chose the person to replace Phil Mendelson as at-large council member for 70 days before a special election was held. Allen was opposed to the process, saying that only the voters should choose the replacement for an at-large vacancy, not a small group of party committee members.

2014 election
Allen was the chief of staff of Ward 6 Council Member Tommy Wells. After Wells decided not to run for reelection in order to run for mayor, Allen resigned from his position and announced his candidacy to succeed Wells seat in the Council representing Ward 6. Darrel Thompson, a former deputy chief of staff of Senate Majority Leader Harry Reid, also ran in the Democratic primary. Pranav Badhwar ran in the Libertarian primary.

When campaigning, Allen emphasized his work helping Ward 6 working for Wells, saying that gave him extensive knowledge and experience about Ward 6. Allen opposed the Large Retailer Accountability Act, which would have increased the minimum wage for large businesses located in the District, preferring instead an across-the-board minimum wage increase as opposed to a bill that only targeted large retailers. Allen also did not access donations to his campaign from corporations. Allen also criticized Thompson, saying Thompson's work has kept him focused on Nevada rather than the District, using the fact that Thompson has not voted in several District elections to make his case. Thompson responded saying that he knew the District well because he was born in the District, unlike Allen.

Thompson called Allen the "anointed candidate", a reference to Wells' choosing his own successor and labeling Allen as a political insider. Thompson also says that Allen is effectively asking for more time to carry out Wells' agenda that should have been completed during Wells' eight years on the Council.

Allen was endorsed by the editorial board of The Washington Post, Service Employees International Union, D.C. for Democracy, D.C. Chamber of Commerce PAC, the D.C. Chapter of the National Organization for Women, the D.C. Association of Realtors, Clean Slate Now,
the local firefighters' union, and the local police officers' union. The local American Federation of State, County and Municipal Employees endorsed Thompson.

Allen and his treasurer Patrick Johnson opted for a campaign finance model that did not accept corporate donations. This was consistent with Allen's championing of campaign finance reform, having been a supporter of DC's Initiative 70 in 2012.

In the Democratic primary election, Allen defeated Thompson, with 58 percent of the vote.

Allen faced Libertarian Party candidate Pranav Badhwar in the general election. Allen won the general election with 88 percent of the vote. His term began January 2, 2015.

Results

2018 Election
During the 2018 Democratic primary election, Allen faced a primary challenger in Lisa Hunter, who worked in the Peace Corps and on the Barack Obama 2008 presidential campaign. Allen won in the primary with a wide majority of the vote.

In the general election on November 8, Allen defeated Republican Micheal Bekesha with over 80% of the vote.

Deteriorating Relationship With DC Police Force and Union

Despite endorsements from DC's police force and union early in his political career, Allen has been criticized more recently by DC's Police Union for weakening the police force by "shrinking" it, resulting in a crime wave the likes of which the city has not seen in 20 years. In an advertisement released in April, 2022, the Police Union points to Allen and Phil Mendelson for the results of crime bills that do not support law enforcement. Subsequently, the Union made an urgent plea to Mayor Bowser, noting that two years of reform under the City Council have done nothing to increase safety, but rather Allen and Mendelson's reforms have resulted in more deaths, "The experiment is a failure, and people are dying." 

Further, by December 30, 2022, the police union released the following statistics of increases in crime since the reforms were enacted: "Armed robberies increased by 36%; Carjackings increased by 177%. Also noteworthy, the annual homicide rate was less than 90 in 2012; 104 and 105 in 2013 and 2014 respectively.
"Some neighborhoods are suffering greatly from this violence," the D.C. Police Union said. "In Ward 2, for example, homicides have increased 440% when looking at the last three years against the previous three."

The police union placed blame on the increase in violence on Ward 6 Councilmember Charles Allen who they claim has "turned a blind eye to concerned residents and public safety experts, rather he chooses to cater to an activist crowd whose agenda is anti-police whatever the cost." They continued by saying that Allen's reform measures have resulted in a tragic loss of life and an increase in violent crime." Allen's office responded, calling representation of the police force "lackluster," and blaming the uptick in gun violence across the city on the pandemic.

Results

Committees
As of March 2020, Allen currently serves on the following committees:
 Committee on the Judiciary and Public Safety (Chairperson)
 Committee of the Whole
 Committee on Education 
 Committee on Business and Economic Development
 Committee on Transportation and the Environment
 Committee on Education
 Committee on Labor and Workforce Development

References

Living people
21st-century American politicians
Members of the Council of the District of Columbia
Politicians from Birmingham, Alabama
University of Alabama at Birmingham alumni
Washington and Lee University alumni
Washington, D.C., Democrats
Washington, D.C., government officials
1977 births